Rock Rapids is a city in and the county seat of Lyon County, Iowa, United States.  The population was 2,611 in the 2020 census, an increase from 2,573 in the 2000 census.

History
A post office called Rock Rapids has been in operation since 1871. The city was named from the falls on the Rock River.

Geography
Rock Rapids is located at  (43.427933, -96.168640), along the Rock River.

Climate
Rock Rapids has a humid continental climate (Koppen Dfa), with cold winters and hot summers.

Demographics

2010 census
As of the census of 2010, there were 2,549 people, 1,083 households, and 689 families living in the city. The racial makeup of the city was 98.2% White, 0.2% African American, 0.1% Native American, 0.1% Asian, 0.8% from other races, and 0.6% from two or more races. Hispanic or Latino of any race were 1.8% of the population.

There were 1,083 households, of which 28.3% had children under the age of 18 living with them, 53.2% were married couples living together, 8.0% had a female householder with no husband present, 2.4% had a male householder with no wife present, and 36.4% were non-families. 33.7% of all households were made up of individuals, and 18.4% had someone living alone who was 65 years of age or older. The average household size was 2.28 and the average family size was 2.92.

The median age in the city was 42.1 years. 24.4% of residents were under the age of 18; 6.2% were between the ages of 18 and 24; 23% were from 25 to 44; 24.6% were from 45 to 64; and 21.9% were 65 years of age or older. The gender makeup of the city was 47.1% male and 52.9% female.

2000 census
As of the census of 2000, there were 2,573 people, 1,085 households, and 720 families living in the city. The racial makeup of the city was 99.14% White, 0.16% African American, 0.04% Native American, 0.35% Asian, 0.04% from other races, and 0.27% from two or more races. Hispanic or Latino of any race were 0.23% of the population.

There were 1,085 households, out of which 27.7% had children under the age of 18 living with them, 57.7% were married couples living together, 6.6% had a female householder with no husband present, and 33.6% were non-families. 31.3% of all households were made up of individuals, and 17.6% had someone living alone who was 65 years of age or older. The average household size was 2.28 and the average family size was 2.86.

23.5% are under the age of 18, 6.2% from 18 to 24, 22.5% from 25 to 44, 21.7% from 45 to 64, and 26.1% who were 65 years of age or older. The median age was 43 years. For every 100 females, there were 87.8 males. For every 100 females age 18 and over, there were 81.8 males.

The median income for a household in the city was $35,135, and the median income for a family was $47,688. Males had a median income of $30,691 versus $19,425 for females. The per capita income for the city was $18,035. About 3.4% of families and 7.5% of the population were below the poverty line, including 7.0% of those under age 18 and 12.5% of those age 65 or over.

Education
Rock Rapids is served by the Central Lyon Community School District. The town of Doon is also included in this school district.

Parks and recreation
One of the highlights of Rock Rapids is Island Park, so named because part of the park is completely surrounded by the Rock River. Island Park features a Rock Island railroad trestle that has been resurfaced as part of a new recreation trail and a museum in the nearby retired depot. There are two small dams in the park.

Another notable park is Emma Sater Park, which is home to the Melan Bridge.

Mural Society 
The Rock Rapids Mural Society was formed in 2002 to restore its historic past in artistic form.

Notable people

 Bruce B. Brugmann, editor and publisher of the San Francisco Bay Guardian (a progressive newspaper), grew up in Rock Rapids and graduated from Central Lyon High School.
 Jerry Mathers, Leave It to Beaver star,  resided in Rock Rapids as a youngster prior to achieving fame as a child actor.
 Donald J. Grout, author of A History of Western Music. Professor at Harvard, Cornell and University of Texas.
Tom Pringle, who voiced the Silly Rabbit in the Trix Cereal commercials from 1992-1998 was born and raised in Rock Rapids Iowa.
 Constance Congdon, American playwright and librettist. Recipient of the National Endowment for the Arts, the W. Alton Jones Foundation, and the Guggenheim Foundation grant, and is the recipient of a 2019 Lilly Award, which recognizes extraordinary women in theatre. In 2021 she was honored with the Legacy Playwrights Initiative Award by the Dramatists Guild Foundation, for her sustained achievement, enduring excellence and influence on the American theater. Congdon was described by Tony Kushner as "one of the best playwrights our country, and our language, has produced."

See also

 Rock River
 Rock Rapids BCR&N station

References

External links

 City of Rock Rapids
 City-Data Comprehensive Statistical Data and more about Rock Rapids

Dutch-American culture in Iowa
Cities in Lyon County, Iowa
Cities in Iowa
County seats in Iowa